The 1972–73 Ohio Bobcats men's basketball team represented Ohio University as a member of the Mid-American Conference in the college basketball season of 1972–73. The team was coached by Jim Snyder and played their home games at Convocation Center. The Bobcats finished with a record of 16–10 and finished fourth in the MAC regular season with a conference record of 6–5.

Schedule

|-
!colspan=9 style=| Regular Season

Source:

Statistics

Team Statistics
Final 1972–73 Statistics

Source

Player statistics

Source

References

Ohio Bobcats men's basketball seasons
Ohio
Ohio Bobcats men's basketball
Ohio Bobcats men's basketball